Onewe (stylized in all caps) is a South Korean alternative rock band composed of five members: Yonghoon, Harin, Kanghyun, Dongmyeong and CyA. The members originally formed under the name M.A.S 0094 (Make a Sound 0094). They released their first digital single "Butterfly, Find a Flower" on August 13, 2015 under Modern Music. In April 2017, they moved to RBW and were renamed MAS. In June 2018, it was announced that the band would redebut under the new band name, Onewe. The band officially made its re-debut on May 13, 2019 with their first single album 1/4.

Career

2015–2016: Formation and debut
Formed in May 2015, M.A.S 0094 was an independent group that performed and covered well-known songs in public with all profits going to charity for comfort women victims. The proceeds of their first digital single, "Butterfly, Find a Flower", released on August 13, 2015, also went towards charity.

M.A.S 0094 released their first EP, Feeling Good Day, on March 25, 2016. The EP contains six tracks, including the lead single "Feeling Good" and their digital single "Butterfly, Find a Flower" that was previously released.

They officially debuted on August 2 with their song "After 15 Seconds" which was performed on the music program The Show.

In November, the band held a performance called "Masland". They also released the single "Starlight".

On December 30, M.A.S 0094 performed as a session band for Mamamoo's performance during the 2016 KBS Song Festival. On December 31, they were the only Korean act to participate and were the finale performance in the Hello Starlight Forest New Year's Eve Concert held at Changsha, China.

2017–2018: Make Some Noise, survival show and rebrand as Onewe
On January 6, 2017, the band released their second EP Make Some Noise. The EP contains six tracks, including the lead single "Make Some Noise" and "Starlight". In February, they held a concert in celebration of 200 days since their debut.

In April, the band signed a contract with RBW, moving from Modern Music to RBW and shortening their name to MAS. Also that month, Dongmyeong represented RBW in the reality television series Produce 101 Season 2. Dongmyeong later was eliminated in 68th place during episode 5.

MAS participated in the reality television series The Unit during October. In the 7th episode, Harin (52nd), Yonghoon (58th), Cya (59th) and Kanghyun (61st) were eliminated. Dongmyeong made it to the finale where he was later eliminated (16th).

In December, MAS joined the RBW debut project RBW Trainee Real Life – We Will Debut along with pre-debut team RBW Boyz (now Oneus). They later held a concert for the project's second season entitled We Will Debut Chapter 2 – Special Party in the same month.

In June 2018, RBW revealed that MAS would re-debut under the name "Onewe". In September, they released a pre-debut single and music video for "Last Song" along with their labelmate Oneus. On December 23, they held a Christmas concert entitled "Studio We : Live #1".

2019: Re-debut and Japan debut
Onewe made their official re-debut on May 13, 2019 with the release of their first single album titled 1/4, with the lead single "Reminisce About All"

They made their debut in Japan on June 7, releasing a single album containing the Japanese versions of the songs included in 1/4. It made Tower Records Japan's "Top 10 Best-Selling Japanese Singles released by Korean Artists" for the first half of 2019. They later held their first Japanese concert, called Prologue, on June 8.

On June 30, they held a concert entitled Studio We : Live #2 The Name of the Star I Live On.

On August 29, the band released its second single album 2/4, with their lead single "Regulus". On the same day, Onewe made their music show debut on M Countdown.

On October 13, they held a mini concert entitled Studio We : Live #3" Fallin’ Good Day. On December 29, they held a Christmas mini concert entitled Studio We : Live #4" My Own Band Room.

2020: ONE and major releases
On April 2, 2020, the band released their third single album 3/4, with the lead single "Q", composed by member CyA and featured Hwasa. The single entered the Billboard's World Digital Song Sales at number 12.

Onewe's first full-length album, One, was released on May 26. The album includes tracks from previous releases along with three new songs, including the title track "End of Spring".

On September 12, Onewe held their first on-tact live concert entitled O! NEW E!volution.  On September 24, the band pre-released their lead single "Parting", along with a music video. The single was followed by the release of the band's first demo album Studio We: Recording on October 4.

From November 13 to 15 they held an online mini concert entitled "Studio We : Live #5" A Moment in Full Bloom Under Two Starlights.

On December 11, the band released their new single album Memory: Illusion, with their lead single "A Book In Memory".

2021: Studio We: Live, Planet Nine: Alter Ego and Studio We: Recording #2
On January 23 and 24, they held an online mini concert entitled "Studio We : Live #6" Onewe? or Onewe!. On March 6 and 7, they held an encore concert in Rolling Hall.

On June 16, Onewe released their first EP Planet Nine: Alter Ego, with their lead single "Rain To Be". All 5 members participated in writing or composing the songs on the album, with Kanghyun writing and composing the lead single. The B-side "Aurora" ranked at number one on MTV's 21 best K-Pop B-sides of 2021 list.

Released on September 8, CyA co-wrote labelmates Purple Kiss's title track "Zombie" for their album Hide & Seek.

The group released a pre-release digital single "Star" on November 23, in advance of their second demo album, Studio We: Recording #2, on December 7.

On December 21, Onewe released a new collaboration single with Oneus titled "Stay".

2022: Planet Nine: Voyager and Timeless
On January 4, Onewe released their second EP Planet Nine: Voyager with the lead single "Universe_".

On May 20, Onewe released their special album Timeless, with the lead single "Roommate".

On July 12, Yonghoon enlisted in the military to serve his mandatory military service and Kanghyun enlisted on August 2. Following their enlistment, on October 4, the group released the single "Still Here", with a music video released the same day. The song was composed and prepared by Yonghoon and Kanghyun for the group, prior to their enlistment. On October 18, they released their third demo album Studio We: Recording #3.

Members

Current (active) 
Harin (하린) - drummer
Dongmyeong (동명) - keyboardist, vocalist
CyA (키아) - bassist, rapper

Current (inactive) 
Yonghoon (용훈) - leader, main vocalist
Kanghyun (강현) - guitarist

Discography

Studio albums

Extended plays

Single albums

Demo albums

Singles

As lead artist

Collaborations

Soundtrack appearances

Other songs

Filmography

Television

Accolades

Listicles

Notes

References

External links

Facebook

K-pop music groups
South Korean boy bands
Musical groups established in 2015
2015 establishments in South Korea
Musical quintets